Stewart Buttress is a rock bluff, 1,005 m high, 3.7 km south of Maro Cliffs in the Theron Mountains. First mapped by Commonwealth Trans-Antarctic Expedition (1956–57) and named for Reginald H.A. Stewart, meteorologist with the advance party of the Commonwealth Trans-Antarctic Expedition in 1955–56.

Important Bird Area
Stewart Buttress is part of the 665 ha Coalseam Cliffs and Mount Faraway Important Bird Area (IBA), designated as such by BirdLife International because it supports a colony of about 10,000 breeding pairs of Antarctic petrels. The birds nest in a scree-filled hollow between two 60 m high dolerite cliffs. Other birds recorded as breeding in the vicinity include snow petrels and south polar skuas.

References

External links

Important Bird Areas of Antarctica
Seabird colonies
Cliffs of Coats Land